Bodybuilding.com is an American online retailer based in Boise, Idaho, specializing in dietary supplements, sports supplements and bodybuilding supplements.

Aside from its commercial responsibilities, Bodybuilding.com publishes daily editorial content, training plans and streams live broadcasts of major bodybuilding competitions. It also operates its own fitness-themed social network, BodySpace, with over 2.7 million active members. The success of the website has led to a number of proprietary sports nutrition products and accessories being developed and sold under its name.

In September 2015, the CEO and founder Ryan DeLuca stepped down from his role, announcing he would be succeeded on an interim basis by Liberty Media CFO Chris Shean. Chris Shean was subsequently replaced with the appointment of Karl Walsh in October 2021.

History
Bodybuilding.com grew out of wholesale-creatine.com, an online storefront created by teenage web marketer and amateur bodybuilder Ryan DeLuca in 1997, to capitalize on the rising popularity of creatine supplements.  After two years of success, usually filling orders out of his garage, DeLuca purchased the domain Bodybuilding.com for $20,000, at age 21. The site went live on April 13, 1999, and within a year also launched teenbodybuilding.com. It was eventually merged into the primary domain name, bodybuilding.com.

After years of rapid growth, a majority stake in Bodybuilding.com was acquired in July 2006 by Milestone Partners for an undisclosed amount. That same year, Inc. Magazine ranked DeLuca number five on its list "30 Under 30: America's Coolest Entrepreneurs."  In January 2008, Liberty Media Corporation acquired a controlling stake in Bodybuilding.com for more than $100 million. DeLuca stayed on as the company's CEO.

As of 2014, Bodybuilding.com is a nine-time honoree on the Inc. 5000 ranking of America's fastest-growing companies, with a reported revenue in 2013 of $420 million. It has 450 employees working at 3 locations, including distribution centers in North Las Vegas, NV; Shiremanstown, PA; and Bedfordshire, U.K. The corporate headquarters is also located in Boise, along with the company's customer service call center.

In 2013, the company donated the equipment for Boise's first outdoor gym, located in Ann Morrison Park.

Misidentified drugs
In 2007, an FDA agent purchased several dietary supplements from the company which were determined to contain anabolic steroids. In May 2012, Bodybuilding.com was fined $7 million, and as part of the settlement, CEO DeLuca and his brother Jeremy were both fined $600,000 for selling misbranded drugs.

Ryan Deluca Steps Down 
In September 2015, Founder and CEO Ryan Deluca suddenly announced he would be stepping down from his position as CEO.

Vitalize, LLC. 

In 2015, Liberty Interactive spun off Bodybuilding.com and its stake in Expedia into a new company, Liberty Expedia Holdings. In December 2016 after a massive layoff, Bodybuilding.com reorganized to form 4 different companies/brands.

Vitalize, LLC owns and operates multiple brands dedicated to health, fitness & nutrition. Verity Brands is a food technology and manufacturing company focused on functional food and nutritional supplements.

Jas Krdzalic acts as CEO of Vitalize, and Bodybuilding.com.

Retail Ecommerce Ventures
On July 1, 2022, Bodybuilding.com formed a partnership with Retail Ecommerce Ventures, in which they acquired and have full control of the brand.

On March 2, 2023, Retail Ecommerce Ventures, Bodybuilding.com's current parent, announced that it was mulling a possible bankruptcy filing.

Contest broadcasts
Since 2007, Bodybuilding.com enlisted pioneer internet webcast company Chapman Media Group owner Travis Chapman, to use TheFitShow.tv on Bodybuilding.com as the basis for the first video marketing platform highlighting bodybuilding's top Pro athletes and trainers, recorded training at Golds Gym Venice beach. The first webcast was produced in LA and secondly the Tribeca Center in New York City, followed by Dallas, Columbus, and Las Vegas. Travis Chapman and Greg Helberg produced and directed all broadcasts to 2021. Shows streamed free online broadcasts included the world's two largest bodybuilding and fitness and figure competitions, Joe Weider's Olympia Weekend and Arnold Schwarzenegger's Arnold Classic, now known as the Arnold Sports Festival. At the Olympia Weekend, the events broadcast include the Mr. Olympia and Ms. Olympia competitions, as well as the 212 Olympia Showdown, Fitness Olympia, Figure Olympia, and since 2013, the Men's Physique Showdown and Women's Physique Showdown. At the Arnold Sports Festival, broadcasts cover the Arnold Classic bodybuilding competition and, since 2014, the Arnold Classic 212 for men, and the Ms. International, Fitness International, Figure International, and Bikini International for women.

Bodybuilding.com's commentators at these events include former and current physique competitors and analysts such as Dave Farra, Larry Pepe, Bob Cicherillo, Dan Solomon, Lou Ferrigno, Ronnie Coleman, Nicole Wilkins-Lee, and Layne Norton, among others. In addition to analysis and play-by-play, the broadcasts include interviews with current and former competitors and a Webcast Fan's Choice.

See also 
List of Internet forums

References

Online retailers of the United States
Internet properties established in 1999
Bodybuilding mass media
Companies based in Boise, Idaho
1999 establishments in Idaho